Leopardi is a 2014 Italian drama film directed by Mario Martone. It was selected to compete for the Golden Lion at the 71st Venice International Film Festival. It was also screened in the Contemporary World Cinema section at the 2014 Toronto International Film Festival.

Plot
The film tells the story of the short life of the great Italian poet Giacomo Leopardi. He was a noble, born in Recanati, and soon began to study Latin, Greek, Hebrew, Aramaic and English in the rich library of his palace that his father built. Giacomo, however, possessing an inquisitive, restless spirit, would like to travel abroad to widen his views and enrich his knowledge, as was usual for European landed gentry in the 19th century, though this desire is at odds with his parents (even if his father had a sensibility akin to his, he is too bound by the social conventions and the expectations tied to his role as 'Pater Familias'; his mother, on the other hand, is too busy shoring up the household declining fortunes to even care about intellectual aspirations). So the poet begins to write his first works, reflecting on the human condition, coming to the conclusion that unhappiness is a constant factor of human existence, and that in life there is no remedy for this problem. In the 1820s, Leopardi can finally leave his native Recanati, and begin to travel to Rome and Florence where, however, his high expectations of intellectual rewards and public recognition are not achieved. He suffered from repeated instances of unrequited love: that he chiefly felt towards the Countess Fanny Targioni Tozzetti, contributing to Leopardi's negative view of life and human experience. He finally moves to Naples, where a physical affliction results in his premature death.

Cast

 Elio Germano as Giacomo Leopardi
 Isabella Ragonese as Paolina Leopardi
 Anna Mouglalis as Fanny Targioni Tozzetti
 Michele Riondino as Antonio Ranieri
 Massimo Popolizio as Monaldo Leopardi
 Valerio Binasco as Pietro Giordani
 Paolo Graziosi as  Carlo Antici
 Iaia Forte as Miss Rosa

Awards

References

External links
 

2014 films
2014 drama films
2014 biographical drama films
2010s Italian-language films
Italian biographical drama films
Films directed by Mario Martone
Cultural depictions of Italian men
Giacomo Leopardi
Cultural depictions of poets